Georg Alexander Docherty (6 May 1904 – 3 November 1973) was a Canadian middle-distance runner. He competed in the men's 1500 metres at the 1928 Summer Olympics.

References

External links
 

1904 births
1973 deaths
Athletes (track and field) at the 1928 Summer Olympics
Canadian male middle-distance runners
Olympic track and field athletes of Canada
Athletes from Toronto